Bangladesh–Kenya relations refer to the bilateral relations between Bangladesh and Kenya. Bangladesh has an embassy in Nairobi.

History 

Records exist of envoys from the Kenyan city-state of Malindi being hosted in the court of the Bengal Sultanate. Animals constituted a significant part of tributes in medieval Bengali courts. The Kenyan envoys brought giraffes, which were also noticed by the Chinese envoys in Bengal. Sultan Shihabuddin Bayazid Shah then gifted one of the Masai giraffes to Emperor Yongle of Ming China in 1414.

High level visits 
Former Bangladesh Minister for Textiles and Jute, Abdul Latif Siddique paid an official visit to Nairobi in 2012.

Agricultural cooperation 
Kenya has been one of the desired destinations for Bangladesh to lease unused cultivable lands in order to ensure future food security. Kenya has also expressed its interest to lease out vast arable lands to Bangladesh. The lands will be used to grow rice and cottons.

Economic relations 
Bangladesh and Kenya have shown mutual interest in expanding bilateral trade and investments. Jute is a major product that Bangladesh has been exporting to Kenya. Kenya has also been importing medicines from Bangladesh. In 2012, a Bangladeshi delegation led by the Minister for Textiles and Jute paid a visit to Nairobi and held talks with several trade bodies and ministries of Kenya to explore potential ways for increasing economic activities between the two countries. Bangladesh also exports pharmaceutical medicine to Mauritius.

References 

 
Kenya
Bilateral relations of Kenya